Mark Sykes (born 4 August 1997) is an Irish professional footballer who plays for English club Bristol City as a midfielder. Born in Northern Ireland, he plays for the Republic of Ireland national team.

Club career

Glenavon
Born in Belfast, Sykes began his career with Glenavon. In December 2017 he was linked with a transfer away from the club. In February 2018 he signed a new contract until the end of the 2018–19 season. In March 2018 he was described by a journalist as "one of the most outstanding young prospects in the Irish League".

Oxford United
In January 2019 he signed for English club Oxford United, making his debut on 8 January 2019 in the EFL Trophy. He scored his first goal for Oxford against Millwall in the EFL Cup on 27 August 2019, and his first league goal in a 2–1 victory over AFC Wimbledon on 29 December 2019. In his three and a half seasons at the club he made 137 appearances and scored 12 times, including Oxford's consolation goal in their 2–1 defeat to Wycombe Wanderers in the 2020 EFL League One play-off Final at Wembley Stadium.

Bristol City
In May 2022, Bristol City announced that they had signed Sykes, with the transfer becoming official on 1 July 2022, on a three-year deal with the option of a further year.

International career
He has also played for Northern Ireland at under-18, under-19 and under-21 youth levels. He made his debut for the under-21 side in September 2016, in a 2–0 defeat to Macedonia and as of 28 January 2019 had 11 caps and 2 goals.

He received his first call-up to the Northern Ireland senior team in May 2019. He was called up again in September 2019.
In August 2020 he informed the Irish Football Association (which governs football in Northern Ireland) that he no longer wished to be considered for their squad, instead opting for the Republic of Ireland. In March 2022, he was named in Stephen Kenny's Republic of Ireland squad for forthcoming friendly matches. 

Sykes was named as a late inclusion to the squad in November 2022 for the Republic of Ireland's November friendlies with Norway and Malta, following the withdrawals of two players through injury.

On 20 November 2022, Sykes made his debut in a 1–0 win over Malta, becoming the first Belfast–born player to represent the Republic of Ireland since 1946.

Career statistics

Club

International

Honours
Glenavon
Irish Cup: 2015–16
Individual
Ulster Young Footballer of the Year 2017–18

References

1997 births
Living people
Sportspeople from Belfast
Republic of Ireland association footballers
Republic of Ireland international footballers
Association footballers from Northern Ireland
Republic of Ireland international footballers from Northern Ireland
Glenavon F.C. players
Oxford United F.C. players
Bristol City F.C. players
NIFL Premiership players
Association football midfielders
Northern Ireland youth international footballers
Northern Ireland under-21 international footballers
English Football League players